The Grand Inga Dam is a series of seven proposed hydroelectric power stations at the site of the Inga Falls, in the Democratic Republic of the Congo. If built as planned, the 40-70 GW project would be the largest power station in the world.

Location

Overview

The project would involve building a dam across the south of the Bundi River valley where it meets the Congo, then diverting the Congo from above the waterfalls into the north of the valley to create a huge reservoir.
It is anticipated that the vertical drop, the volume and velocity of water flow at this site, can support a series of hydroelectric power stations, each with generation capacity ranging from 4 to 8 GW for a total of 40 GW for the whole complex. Inga III Power Station with capacity of 4.8 GW, would be the first power station in the series, to be constructed. The current design allows for the independent development of the different power stations in the series, as well as the phased development of each station. Each of the seven dams could be owned by different investors.

Financing
The total construction bill for Grand Inga has been calculated to be as high as $80 billion. The World Bank, the European Investment Bank and the African Development Bank, have provided funding for feasibility and environmental impact studies. In 2016, the World Bank cancelled its support for the Grand Inga Project. It is expected that the power stations will be developed as a public private partnership project.

Recent developments
In June 2020, the Government of the Democratic Republic of the Congo resolved to present the project to the regional heads of State and explore the market on the continent for the power generated. They have recruited the African Union and the New Partnership for Africa's Development in their efforts to get the power station built. South Africa has indicated willingness to buy 2.5 GW of the dam's output. Nigeria is interested in buying 3 GW  and the Congolese mines in Katanga Province are interested in 1.3 GW.

See also
 Inga dams
 List of largest power stations in the world
List of planned renewable energy projects
 List of power stations in the Democratic Republic of the Congo

References

External links
 Construction of US $14bn Grand Inga dam in Congo on track As of 5 November 2019.

Dams in the Democratic Republic of the Congo
Hydroelectric power stations in the Democratic Republic of the Congo
Proposed renewable energy power stations in the Democratic Republic of the Congo
Proposed hydroelectric power stations